Stenalia occidentalis is a beetle in the genus Stenalia of the family Mordellidae. It was described in 1955 by Franciscolo.

References

occidentalis
Beetles described in 1955